The Most Venerable Wewaldeniye Medhalankara Thero (7 December 1909 – 30 August 2012) was a Sri Lankan Buddhist monk who was the 12th Maha Nayaka of Ramanna Nikaya and the chief incumbent of the Shasanawardhana Pirivena, Mirigama. Following his demise, he was succeeded by Most Ven. Napane Pemasiri Thero as the Maha Nayaka of Ramanna Nikaya.

See also
 Sri Lankan Buddhism

References

1909 births
2012 deaths
Sri Lankan centenarians
Sri Lankan Buddhist monks
20th-century Buddhist monks
21st-century Buddhist monks
Men centenarians